William Hunter Cavendish (c. 1740–1818) was an American politician. He represented Greenbrier County in the Virginia House of Delegates 1790–1799 and 1802–1803, where he was affiliated with the Federalist Party.

Notes

1740 births
1818 deaths
Members of the Virginia House of Delegates
People from Greenbrier County, West Virginia